Mark Gregory (born Marco De Gregorio, 2 May 1964 – 31 January 2013) was an Italian film actor.

Career 
Gregory worked as a waiter, before being discovered in a gym in Rome. After his fiancée sent his picture to Fulvia Film, he was cast over some 2,000 candidates for the role of "Trash" in the 1982 science fiction thriller 1990: The Bronx Warriors, starring alongside Christopher Connelly and Fred Williamson. The film was heavily inspired by Mad Max 2 (1981) and The Warriors (1979). In the film Adam and Eve: The First Love Story (1983), he played the biblical character Adam. His dark looks resulted in him being cast as a vengeful Native American in the First Blood-inspired 1983 action film Thunder Warrior. He starred in the film Delta Force Commando (1988), starring again alongside Fred Williamson.

Gregory's last acting role was a starring role in Afghanistan – The Last War Bus (1989).

Personal life 
According to the working documents of his first film, 1990: The Bronx Warriors, Gregory was born Marco De Gregorio; for a long time, some sources reported his birth name incorrectly as Marco Di Gregorio. His father was a painter and sculptor. He grew up in the area of Porta Pia/Piazza Fiume in Rome. According to the same documentation, at the time of the shooting of 1990: The Bronx Warriors he was not 17 years old, as it was also commonly reported, but he had recently turned 18.

After Afghanistan – The Last War Bus, Gregory abandoned the film industry. According to one of his co-stars in that film, Bobby Rhodes, "At a certain point he (Mark Gregory) abhorred this (film) environment and withdrew ... like that, suddenly. Now he is a painter and a madonnaro. I don't know what he disappointed him and pushed him to cut everything drastically; but one thing is certain: he doesn't want to know anything more about cinema. Strange, because Marco gave up just when he was at the height of his success, when he was starting to get paid well ..."

Following the end of his film career, Gregory at some point was reportedly the victim of a scam that led him to lose his house and everything he owned. Afterwards, he moved to Castel Madama, but always struggled with financial and psychological problems. On 31 January 2013, he took his own life via an overdose of psychotropic drugs.

Filmography

References

External links

1964 births
2013 deaths
Italian male film actors
Drug-related suicides in Italy
Male actors from Rome